The Barcelona Mass is a polyphonic mass written around 1360. Together with the Messe de Nostre Dame by Guillaume de Machaut and those of Toulouse, Tournai and the Sorbonne, it is one of the earliest preserved complete polyphonic musical settings of the Ordinary of the Mass. It is believed to belong to the repertoire of the Papal court at Avignon and is also linked to the chapel of King Martin I of Aragon.

It is preserved in a single manuscript kept in the Biblioteca de Catalunya in Barcelona (ms. 971), where it was found in 1925 by the musicologist Higinio Anglés.

It consists of the usual five parts, the Kyrie, Gloria, Credo, Sanctus and Agnus Dei. The Agnus Dei is written in four voices, while the other movements have three. The five parts are not written according to a unifying structural pattern and may have been written by different anonymous composers. The Gloria and Credo have also been independently preserved as standalone pieces in other sources. Unlike other mass cycles of the period, the Barcelona Mass contains neither a motetus over Ite, missa est nor a setting of the Benedictus, and its movements are not based on plain chant.

Recordings
 Atrium Musicae de Madrid: Messe de Barcelone – Ars Nova du XIVe siècle. Harmonia Mundi 1972
 Pro Cantione Antiqua, London, Mark Brown (dir.): Missa Tournai. Missa Barcelona. Harmonia Mundi 1980
 Ensemble médiéval de Toulouse: La Messe de Barcelone / La Messe de Toulouse. Ariane 1988
 Linnamuusikud: AD 1994. Tallinn : Linnamuusikud, 1994
 Obsidienne: Barcelona Mass / Song of the Sibyl. Opus 111, 1995

References
Richard H. Hoppin, Medieval Music. Norton, 1978.
María del Carmen Gómez Muntané, El manuscrito M971 de la Biblioteca de Catalunya (Misa de Barcelona). Barcelona, Biblioteca de Catalunya, 1989.

External links
Mass of Barcelona, La Trobe University, Medieval Music Database
Barcelona, Biblioteca de Catalunya 971 (olim 946), La Trobe University, Medieval Music Database.
DIAMM images (login required) and manuscript description Digital Image Archive of Medieval Music

Catalan music
Masses (music)
Anonymous musical compositions
Medieval compositions